Binoy Kumar Dewan (9 March 1925 – 21 July 2021) was a Bangladeshi politician from Rangamati belonging to Jatiya Party. He was a former member of the Jatiya Sangsad. He was a state minister of the Ministry of Local Government, Rural Development and Co-operatives too. He was also appointed an advisor of the President of Bangladesh.

Biography 
Dewan was born on 9 March 1925 in Rangamati. His father Kamini Mohan Dewan was elected as a member of the East Bengal Legislative Assembly in 1954.

Dewan was elected as a member of the Jatiya Sangsad from Rangamati in 1986. Later, he served as state minister of the Ministry of Local Government, Rural Development and Co-operatives from 25 May 1986 to 26 March 1988. He was appointed an advisor of the President of Bangladesh in 1987. He was also elected as a member of the Jatiya Sangsad from Rangamati in 1988.

Binoy Kumar Dewan died on 21 July 2021 in Patharghata, Rangamati.

References 

1925 births
2021 deaths
People from Rangamati District
3rd Jatiya Sangsad members
4th Jatiya Sangsad members
Jatiya Party politicians
State Ministers of Local Government, Rural Development and Co-operatives